The Francesco Giuseppe Bressani Literary Prize is a biennial award created by the Italian Cultural Centre Society of Vancouver in 1986.  It was created to promote and honour Canadian writers of Italian descent.  There are $1000 prizes for poetry (at least 20 poems), fiction (minimum 50 pages) and short fiction (minimum 8000 characters).  A fourth "special category" prize has been given out since 2006.

Works are eligible if published from January 1 of one year to March 31 of the next year.  Submissions must be from Canadian citizens or permanent residents of 16 or older who have at least one parent or grandparent born in Italy, and can be in Italian, English or French. The Prize is named after the Italian Jesuit missionary Francesco Giuseppe Bressani.
The Prize was discontinued in 1995, but the Italian Cultural Centre appointed a new F.G. Bressani Committee in 2000 when it was reinstated.

Winners
1986
From the Frontier to the Little Italies: The Italians in Canada 1800-1941 by Robert F. Harney
1988
Forty Days and Forty Nights (poetry in English) by John Terpstra
In the Skin of a Lion (prose in English) by Michael Ondaatje
Autostrada per la Luna (poetry in Italian) by Silvano Zumaro
1990
Ink from an Octopus (poetry) by Len Gasparini
The Lives of the Saints (prose) by Nino Ricci
1992
Life in Another Language (poetry) by Liliane Welch
A Planet of Eccentrics (prose) by Ven Begamudre
1994
Gardening in the Tropics (poetry) by Olive Senior
The Book of Secrets (prose) by M.G. Vassanji
1996, 1998  Hiatus

2000

Interference (poetry) by Concetta Principe
The City of Yes (novel) by Peter Oliva
The Closer We Are to Dying (short fiction) by Joe Fiorito

2002
Selected Poems (poetry) by Fulvio Caccia
Winter in Montreal (novel) by Pietro Corsi
Fabrizio's Passion (novel) by Antonio D'Alfonso
Breaking the Mould (short fiction) by Penny Petrone

2004
Ariadne's Thread (poetry) by Carmelo Militano
Italian Shoes (novel) by Frank G. Paci

2006

With English Subtitles (poetry) by Carmine Starnino
Cristallo (novel) by Mena Martini
Leftovers (short fiction) by Fabrizio Napoleone
Baseballissimo (creative non-fiction) by Dave Bidini
2008
You Speak to Me in Trees (poetry) by Elana Wolff
Magnifico (novel) by Victoria Miles
Making Olives (short fiction) by Darlene Madott
The Clothesline (creative non-fiction) by Donna Caruso
2010
This Nothing's Place (poetry) by Pasquale Verdicchio
Berlin (fiction) by Michael Mirolla
Made Up of Arias (short fiction) by Michelle Alfano
Finding Rosa (emigration from Italy) by Caterina Edwards
2012
Dancing, with Mirrors (poetry) by George Amabile
The Good Doctor (fiction) by Vince Agro
Small Change (short fiction) by George Amabile
Whoever Gives Us Bread (creative non-fiction) by Lynne Bowen
2014
The House on 14th Avenue (poetry) by Michael Mirolla
Stations of the Heart (fiction) by Darlene Madott
Sweets (short fiction) by Eufemia Fantetti
The Figures of Beauty (Italian theme) by David Macfarlane

2016
Lessons in Relationships Dyads (short stories) by Michael Mirolla

References

Canadian literary awards